Møvik is a village in Rygge municipality, Norway. Its population is 252.

References

Villages in Østfold